Junction railway station was just outside the village of Crossbarry, on the Cork and Bandon Railway in County Cork, Ireland.

History

The station opened as Kinsale Junction on 27 June 1863. It was renamed Junction on 1 November 1886. It was further renamed Crossbarry on 1 July 1938.

Regular passenger services were withdrawn on 1 April 1961.

Routes

Further reading

References

Disused railway stations in County Cork
Railway stations opened in 1863
Railway stations closed in 1961